The Territory of Florida was an organized incorporated territory of the United States that existed from March 30, 1822, until March 3, 1845, when it was admitted to the Union as the state of Florida. It was governed by the Florida Territorial Council.

Background

Florida was encountered by Europeans in 1513 by Juan Ponce de León, who claimed the land as a possession of Spain. St. Augustine, the oldest continually inhabited European settlement in the continental U.S., was founded on the northeast coast of Florida in 1565. Florida continued to remain a Spanish possession until the end of the Seven Years' War when Spain ceded it to the Kingdom of Great Britain in exchange for the release of Havana. In 1783, after the American Revolution, Great Britain ceded Florida back to Spain under the provisions of the Peace of Paris.

The second term of Spanish rule was influenced by the nearby United States. There were border disputes along the boundary with the state of Georgia and issues of American use of the Mississippi. These disputes were supposedly solved in 1795 by the Treaty of San Lorenzo which, among other things, solidified the boundary of Florida and Georgia along the 31st parallel. However, as Thomas Jefferson had once predicted, the U.S. could not keep its hands off Florida.

American involvement pre-1821 

In 1812, United States forces and Georgia "patriots" under General George Mathews unsuccessfully invaded Florida to protect American interests. The "Patriot War" was perceived as ill-advised by many Americans. President Madison withdrew his support and the Spanish authorities were promised a speedy exit of the American troops.

The Spanish government offered runaway slaves freedom if they converted to Catholicism and agreed to a term of military service. Under heavy pressure from the U.S., Spain reversed this policy in the later 18th century, to little effect. Slaves continued to flee to Florida, where they were sheltered by the Florida natives, called Seminoles by Americans. They lived in a semi-feudal system; the Seminoles gave the Blacks protection, while the former slaves, who knew how to farm, shared crops with the natives. Although the escaped slaves were still considered inferior by the Seminoles, the two groups lived in harmony. The slaveholders in Georgia and the rest of the South became furious over this state of affairs as slaves continued to escape to Florida.

In 1818, after years of additional conflicts involving natives, fugitive slaves, and settlers, General Andrew Jackson wrote to President James Monroe, who had been inaugurated in March 1817, informing him that he was invading Florida. Jackson's force departed from Tennessee and marched down to the Florida Panhandle.

Adams–Onís Treaty 

The Adams–Onís Treaty, also known as the Transcontinental Treaty, was signed on February 22, 1819, by John Quincy Adams and Luis de Onís y González-Vara, but did not take effect until after it was ratified by Spain on October 24, 1820, and by the United States on February 19, 1821. The U.S. received Florida under Article 2 and inherited Spanish claims to the Oregon Territory under Article 3, while ceding all its claims on Texas to Spain under Article 3 (with the independence of Mexico in 1821, Spanish Texas became Mexican territory), and pledged to indemnify up to $5,000,000 in claims by American citizens against Spain under Article 11. Under Article 15, Spanish goods received exclusive most favored nation tariff privileges in the ports at Pensacola and St. Augustine for twelve years.

In Dorr v. United States (195 U.S. 138, 141–142 (1904)) Justice Marshall is quoted more extensively as follows:

The 6th article of the treaty of cession contains the following provision:
'The inhabitants of the territories which His Catholic Majesty cedes the United States by this treaty shall be incorporated in the Union of the United States as soon as may be consistent with the principles of the Federal Constitution, and admitted to the enjoyment of the privileges, rights, and immunities of the citizens of the United States.' [8 Stat. at L. 256.]

[195 U.S. 138, 142] 'This treaty is the law of the land, and admits the inhabitants of Florida to the enjoyment of the privileges, rights, and immunities of the citizens of the United States. It is unnecessary to inquire whether this is not their condition, independent of stipulation. They do not, however, participate in political power; they do not share in the government till Florida shall become a state. In the meantime Florida continues to be a territory of the United States, governed by virtue of that clause in the Constitution which empowers Congress 'to make all needful rules and regulations respecting the territory or other property belonging to the United States."

Transfer to Governor Andrew Jackson
On July 10, 1821, the province of East Florida was transferred to Governor Andrew Jackson with strict orders from President James Monroe to observe diplomatic protocol, with West Florida following one week later. Governor Jackson was not involved in the earliest government appointments in the territory and was only acquainted with two of them.

Territorial Florida and the Seminole Wars

President James Monroe was authorized on March 3, 1821, to take possession of East Florida and West Florida for the United States and provide for initial governance. Andrew Jackson served as the federal military commissioner with the powers of governor of the newly acquired territory, from March 10 through December 1821. On March 30, 1822, the United States merged East Florida and part of what formerly constituted West Florida into the Florida Territory. William Pope Duval became the first official governor of the Florida Territory and soon afterward the capital was established at Tallahassee, but only after removing a Seminole tribe from the land. The new capital of Tallahassee was located approximately halfway between the old colonial capitals of Pensacola and St. Augustine. Duval's "government palace for a time was a mere log house, and he lived on hunters' fare."

The central conflict of Territorial Florida originated from attempts to displace the Seminole peoples. The federal government and most white settlers desired all Florida Indians to migrate to the West. On May 28, 1830, Congress passed the Indian Removal Act requiring all Native Americans to move west of the Mississippi River. The Act itself did not mean much to Florida, but it laid the framework for the Treaty of Payne's Landing, which was signed by a council of Seminole chiefs on May 9, 1832, and ratified in 1834. This treaty stated that the Seminoles could organize an exploratory party that would travel to the Indian Territory and survey the assigned lands before they had to agree to relocation, though inhabitants of Florida were expected to relocate by 1835. It was at this meeting that the famous Osceola first voiced his decision to fight. At the Treaty of Fort Gibson, held in Arkansas Territory between the group of Seminoles sent to explore the new territory and the federal government, Americans led the Seminole into agreeing to the terms of relocation, although Seminoles would later claim to having been tricked into this agreement.

Beginning in late 1835, Osceola and the Seminole allies began a guerrilla war against the U.S. forces. Numerous generals fought and failed, succumbing to the heat and disease as well as lack of knowledge of the land. It was not until General Thomas Jesup captured many of the key Seminole chiefs, including Osceola who died in captivity of illness, that the battles began to die down. The Seminoles were eventually forced to migrate. Florida joined the Union as the 27th state on March 3, 1845.  By this time, almost all of the Seminoles were gone, except for a small group living in the Everglades.

In the 1840 United States census, 20 counties in the Florida Territory reported the following population counts (after 15 reported the following counts in the 1830 United States census):

See also

 Legislative Council of the Territory of Florida
 Adams–Onís Treaty of 1819
 Historic regions of the United States
 History of Florida
 List of governors of Florida
 Seminole Wars, 1817–1858
 Spanish Florida
 Territorial evolution of the United States
 East Florida, 1783–1821
 Republic of East Florida (1815)
 Spanish West Florida, 1783–1821
 Republic of West Florida (1810)
 Zephaniah Kingsley

Notes

References

External links
 3 U.S. Statute 654 approved on March 30, 1822 establishing Florida Territory (pages 654–659) from United States Statutes at Large at the Library of Congress website.

 
.
.
1822 establishments in the United States
.
1830s in Florida
.
1840s in Florida
1845 disestablishments in the United States
19th century in Florida
Former organized territories of the United States
Pre-statehood history of Florida